In functional analysis, a branch of mathematics, the Favard operators are defined by:

where , . They are named after Jean Favard.

Generalizations
A common generalization is:

where  is a positive sequence that converges to 0. This reduces to the classical Favard operators when .

References
 This paper also discussed Szász–Mirakyan operators, which is why Favard is sometimes credited with their development (e.g. Favard–Szász operators).

Footnotes

Approximation theory